Pierre Joxe, KBE (born 28 November 1934) is a former French Socialist politician and has been a member of the Constitutional Council of France between 2001 and 2010.

A graduate of the École nationale d'administration, he joined the Court of Audit of France in the 1960s. Whereas his father, Louis Joxe, was Justice Minister of Charles de Gaulle, Pierre Joxe entered politics as a follower of François Mitterrand, first in the Convention of Republican Institutions, then (from 1971) in the renewed Socialist Party (PS). Considered one of the closest allies of the PS leader, he was elected as a deputy for the Saône-et-Loire département in 1973. He presided over the regional council of Burgundy from 1979 to 1982.

In 1981, when Mitterrand was elected President of France, Joxe became Minister of Industry for only one month, before he became leader of the Socialist group in the French National Assembly. Then, he joined the cabinet as Interior Minister from 1984 to the Socialist defeat in the 1986 legislative election. Re-appointed leader of the PS parliamentary group again, he became the Interior Minister after Mitterrand had won a second presidential term in 1988. He was the author of a new law code for Corsica. In 1991, during the Gulf War, he served as Defense Minister.

During March 1993, Joxe gave up politics to lead the Court of Audit of France. Then, he was nominated to the Constitutional Council  (2001–2010). He has two sons, Benoît Joxe and Baptiste Joxe, both from his third marriage.

Political career

First President of the Court of Audit : 1993–2001 (Resignation).

Member of the Constitutional Council of France : 2001–2010.

Governmental functions

Minister of Defence : 1991–1993.

Minister of Interior : 1988–1991.

Minister of Interior and Decentralization : 1984–1986.

Minister of Industry : May–June 1981.

Electoral mandates

National Assembly of France

President of the Socialist Party Group in the National Assembly : 1981–1984 (Became minister in 1984) / 1986–1988. Elected in 1981, reelected in 1986.

Member of the National Assembly of France for Saône-et-Loire : 1973–1981 (Became minister in 1981) / 1981–1984 (Became minister in 1984) / 1986–1988 (Became minister in 1988). Elected in 1978, reelected in 1978, 1981, 1986, 1988.

Regional Council

President of the Regional Council of Burgundy : 1979–1982.

Regional councillor of Ile-de-France : 1992–1993 (Resignation).

General Council

General councillor of Saône-et-Loire : 1973–1979.

Municipal Council

Deputy-mayor of Chalon-sur-Saône : 1977–1983.

Municipal councillor of Chalon-sur-Saône : 1977–1983.

Councillor of Paris : 1989–1993 (Resignation).

References

1934 births
Living people
Politicians from Paris
French Protestants
Convention of Republican Institutions politicians
Socialist Party (France) politicians
French interior ministers
French Ministers of Defence
Deputies of the 5th National Assembly of the French Fifth Republic
Deputies of the 6th National Assembly of the French Fifth Republic
Deputies of the 7th National Assembly of the French Fifth Republic
Deputies of the 8th National Assembly of the French Fifth Republic
Deputies of the 9th National Assembly of the French Fifth Republic
Judges of the Court of Audit (France)
Political whips
École nationale d'administration alumni
Commanders of the Ordre national du Mérite
Honorary Knights Commander of the Order of the British Empire
Grand Cross of the Order of Civil Merit
Commander's Crosses of the Order of Merit of the Republic of Hungary (civil)
Honorary Fellows of the London School of Economics
Recipients of orders, decorations, and medals of Senegal